A language island (a calque of German Sprachinsel; also language enclave, language pocket) is an enclave of a language that is surrounded by one or more different languages. The term was introduced in 1847. 

Examples of language islands:
 Alghero
 Arbëresh
 Betawi
 Brussels
 Chipilo and Chipilo Venetian dialect
 Faetar
 Gorani
 Griko & Grecanico
 Lusatia
 Monégasque
 Palenquero
 Pennsylvania German
 Saterland
 Szeklerland
 Swabian Turkey
 Upper Harz
 And within Sinitic:

 Tianjinnese, a Central Mandarin variety surrounded by Northern varieties
 Ganzhounese, a Southwestern Mandarin variety surrounded by Hakka in southern Jiangxi, being one of the many Junhua
 Hangzhounese, a Mandarinic variety surrounded by Northern Wu lects, caused by the change of capital during the Southern Song Dynasty
 Zhongshan Min, a Southern Min language surrounded by Yue varieties, caused by migrants seeking shelter during the Song and Yuan Dynasties.

Gallery

See also
Enclave and exclave

References

Language geography